Kraft Schepke (born 3 March 1934) is a German rower who competed for the United Team of Germany in the 1960 Summer Olympics.

He was born in Königsberg, Germany, in 1934. Frank Schepke (born 1935) was his brother and they both competed for West Germany.

At the 1958 European Rowing Championships in Poznań, he won a gold medal with the coxless four. At the 1959 European Rowing Championships in Mâcon, he won a gold medal with the eight. At the 1960 Summer Olympics, he was a crew member of the German eight that won gold. At the 1961 European Rowing Championships in Prague, he won a gold medal with the coxed four.

Both he and his brother retired after the 1961 rowing season from competitive rowing. Kraft Schepke then worked for the State Sports Federation of Lower Saxony.

References

1934 births
Living people
Sportspeople from Königsberg
Olympic rowers of the United Team of Germany
Rowers at the 1960 Summer Olympics
Olympic gold medalists for the United Team of Germany
Olympic medalists in rowing
West German male rowers
Medalists at the 1960 Summer Olympics
European Rowing Championships medalists